Soccer on CBS Sports is a number of television programs that have aired soccer matches in the United States on CBS, CBS Sports Network, and Paramount+ (formerly CBS All Access). These matches are from International, European, and American competitions.

Current programming

UEFA club competitions

In November 2019, CBS acquired rights to UEFA club competitions, including the UEFA Champions League, Europa League, for three seasons beginning in the 2021–22 season, replacing Turner Sports. The package would center around the CBS All Access (now Paramount+) subscription service, which carries all matches lives, with selected matches to be carried by the main CBS network. CBS Sports Network largely carries The Golazo Show on matchdays, a "whiparound" show that airs goals and important moments from all matches in a broadcast window. Its name is a reference to "CBS Sports Golazo", the branding used by the network on social media to promote their men's soccer programming. CBS's studio coverage for the Champions League is produced from IMG's studio in Stockley Park, London in association with network-owned Channel 5.

During the suspension of the 2019–20 season due to the COVID-19 pandemic in Europe, Turner Sports dropped out of its contract with UEFA. CBS would pick up the remainder of the contract and begin its coverage early, beginning from the remaining round of 16 matches in August 2020.

National Women's Soccer League

On March 11, 2020, the NWSL announced that it has entered into a three-year media agreement with CBS Sports and the video game-oriented streaming service Twitch. For the 2020 NWSL season, CBS Sports will broadcast 87 matches (including the playoffs) split between CBS, CBS Sports Network, and CBS All Access in Canada and the United States, with the exact distribution among the channels subject to change, while Twitch will stream an additional 24 matches for free. Twitch will also become the NWSL's international media rights holder and stream all matches outside Canada and the United States for free.

CONCACAF 

Paramount+ will offer more than 200 matches from the CONCACAF region, airing English-language rights of Nations League Finals in June 2021 including United States matches, and CONCACAF Men's and Women's World Cup qualifiers, except USA and Mexico home matches.

Brasileirāo and Argentine Primera División 
CBS will stream more than 360 matches a year from Brazil's top-tier Campeonato Brasileiro Série A and more than 300 matches a year from Argentina's Primera División Argentina in English-language on Paramount+.

AFC 
CBS reached an agreement with Asian Football Confederation to acquire the exclusive U.S. rights for several competitions, including Men's World Cup qualifying, Men's Champions League, Men's Asian Cup, Women's Club Championship and Women's Asian Cup (which is also becoming their Women's World Cup qualification). These coverage are expected to begin in the fall of 2021 on Paramount+.

Serie A 
CBS acquired rights of Serie A, replacing ESPN, for three seasons beginning in 2021-22 until 2023–24. More than 400 club matches will be on Paramount+, featuring 380 Serie A matches, 25 Coppa Italia matches—including selected knockout rounds, and the Supercoppa Italiana match each year. Select matches will airing on other CBS Sports platforms, including CBS Sports Network. For the first two weeks, CBS' studio coverage will be based from CBS Sports HQ studio in Stamford, Conn. Additional coverage details will be announced in later date with full studio coverage from CBS Broadcast Center in New York City beginning on Sunday, Sept. 12.

Scottish Professional Football League 
CBS replaced ESPN as the U.S. rights holder of the Scottish Premiership after reaching a multi-year deal beginning from 2021–22 until 2024-25 season. The majority of the matches, including the Scottish Championship and the Scottish League Cup, will air on Paramount+ with select matches, including Old Firm derby are shown on CBS Sports Network.

FA Women's Super League 
CBS was awarded a multi-year contract to broadcast the FA Women's Super League beginning in 2022–23 seasons. A total of 57 matches are scheduled to be aired selectively on the CBS Sports Network and the majority can be accessed via Paramount+.

On-air personalities

Play-by-play 

 UEFA club competitions 
 UEFA Champions League and the UEFA Super Cup – Clive Tyldesley (lead), Andres Cordero, Pien Meulensteen
 UEFA Europa League – Andres Cordero
 UEFA Europa Conference League – Andrés Cordero
 UEFA world feed (Gravity Media): Tony Jones, Martin Tyler (UEFA Champions League only), Guy Mowbray, Dan Mason, Jonathan Pearce, Simon Brotherton, Sam Matterface, Kevin Keatings, Jim Proudfoot, Steve Wilson, Phil Blacker, Dan O'Hagan, Pien Meulensteen
 Serie A – Andrés Cordero
 Serie A world feed: Patrick Kendrick, Owen Neilson, David Windsor, Thomas Holmes Reed, David Ferrini, Simon Harding, Marco Palmieri, James Fielden, Rowan Druffin, Patrick Tarroni, Richard Whittle, Andrew Pickering, Paul Visca, Alex Milone
 CONCACAF – Andrés Cordero, Adrian Garcia Marquez, Lisa Byington
 National Women's Soccer League – Jenn Hildreth, JP Dellacamera, Mike Watts
 Primera División Argentina – Jon Cotterill, Klaus German, Juan Guillermo Arango, Nicolás Samuilov, Francisco Aure, Peter Coates

Color commentators 

 UEFA club competitions  
 UEFA Champions League and the UEFA Super Cup – Robert Green (lead), Ray Hudson, Matthew Upson, Karen Carney
 UEFA Europa League – Ray Hudson 
 UEFA Europa Conference League – Matteo Bonetti
 UEFA world feed (Gravity Media): David Pleat, Alan Smith, Leon Osman, Andy Townsend, Clive Allen, Efan Ekoku, Stewart Robson, Don Goodman, Sue Smith, Laura Bassett
 Serie A – Matteo Bonetti, Mike Grella, Ray Hudson
 Serie A world feed: Massimo Paganin, Manuel Pascali, Lorenzo Amoruso
 CONCACAF – Maurice Edu, Marcelo Balboa, Aly Wagner, Janelly Farías
 National Women's Soccer League – Aly Wagner, Lori Lindsey
 Primera División Argentina – Matt Lawrence, Andrés Schimelman, George D. Metellus

Reporters 

 UEFA Champions League – Guillem Balagué, Jules Breach, Nicolás Cantor
 Serie A – Ana Quiles, Marco Messina
 CONCACAF – Nicolás Cantor, Jenny Chiu
 National Women's Soccer League – Marisa Pilla

Studio hosts 

 UEFA club competitions – Kate Abdo, Jules Breach 
 Golazo Show – Nicolás Cantor, Manish Bhasin, Ayo Akinwolere, Pien Muelensteen
 Serie A –  Poppy Miller
 CONCACAF – Kate Abdo, Poppy Miller
 CBS Sports HQ – Poppy Miller

Studio analysts 

 UEFA club competitions 
 UEFA Champions League and the UEFA Super Cup – Thierry Henry, Jamie Carragher, Micah Richards, Peter Schmeichel, Alex Scott, Freddie Ljungberg
 UEFA Europa and the Europa Conference Leagues – Lianne Sanderson, Jermaine Jones, Maurice Edu, Julien Laurens
 Serie A – Matteo Bonetti, Marco Messina, Fabrizio Romano, Giuseppe Rossi, Mike Grella, Charlie Davies, Antonio Cincotta, Christine Cupo, Aaron West
 CONCACAF – Clint Dempsey, Oguchi Onyewu, Charlie Davies, Briana Scurry, Kaylyn Kyle, Jenny Ruiz-Williams, Janelly Farías 
 CBS Sports HQ – Ian Joy, Luis García, Jimmy Conrad, Heath Pearce, Thomas Rongen, Nigel Reo-Coker, Fabrizio Romano, James Benge, Jonathan Johnson
 Rules analyst – Christina Unkel

Former programming

North American Soccer League

In 1967, two professional soccer leagues started in the United States: the FIFA-sanctioned United Soccer Association, which consisted of entire European and South American teams brought to the US and given local names, and the unsanctioned National Professional Soccer League. The National Professional Soccer League had a national television contract in the U.S. with the CBS television network (which signed a two-year contract to broadcast a game every Sunday afternoon live and in color). The NPSL kicked off on Sunday, April 16 with a full slate of five matches. However, the ratings for matches were unacceptable even by weekend daytime standards and the arrangement was terminated. Bill MacPhail, head of CBS Sports, attributed NASL's lack of TV appeal to empty stadiums with few fans, and to undistinguished foreign players who were unfamiliar to American soccer fans.

The leagues merged in 1968 to form the North American Soccer League (NASL). It has been suggested that the timing of the merge was related to the huge amount of attention given throughout the English-speaking world to the victory by England in the 1966 FIFA World Cup and the resulting documentary film, Goal. While the USSF and FIFA refused to recognize the NPSL, the television contract with CBS guaranteed some element of financial stability.

In 1974, although the Los Angeles Aztecs had a league-best record and points total, and rightly should have hosted the championship final, CBS intervened and strongly influenced the NASL's decision to play the match in Miami. CBS was under contract to air the game live and was unwilling to black-out the large Southern California viewing audience. At the time it was the standard in many US-based sports for the host market not to broadcast games locally unless they were sold out. At the time, the Los Angeles Memorial Coliseum had a capacity of 94,500 and, even in a best-case scenario, an Aztecs sell-out was unlikely. Moreover, in an effort by CBS to capture more viewers during the peak East Coast time slot, a Los Angeles-hosted game would have begun at 12:30 (PDT) local time. The league recognized that both these factors would be detrimental to ticket sales and agreed to move the game to the Miami Orange Bowl with a 3:30 (EDT) local start. CBS had also stepped in the previous week and forced the Toros to play their semi-final match at the much-smaller Tamiami Stadium in Tamiami Park. This was done so that if Miami did win, CBS's production crews would have a full week for set-up in the Orange Bowl stadium.

1974 FIFA World Cup

By 1970, the NASL was struggling, and had lost its TV contract with CBS. As a result, they didn't provide any network TV coverage of the 1970 World Cup.

1974's coverage contained week-old filmed highlights on CBS Sports Spectacular. For the Final, CBS used BBC's feed with announcer David Coleman.

Major Indoor Soccer League

The MISL made inroads on national television in 1982–83. While the spring would see the end of the league's two-year deal with the USA Network, CBS would broadcast a playoff game live from Cleveland on May 7 that drew an estimated four million viewers. One game during the 1983–84 season was televised on CBS (Game 3 of the championship series on June 2) as well.

1984–85 would be the final year the MISL would have games aired on network television, CBS broadcast Game 4 of the championship series live on May 25. CBS used Gary Bender and Kyle Rote Jr. on commentary.

NCAA Men's Soccer Championship
By 1990, CBS would televise the final of the NCAA Division I Men's Soccer Tournament between UCLA Bruins and Rutgers Scarlet Knights. Mike Joy and Seamus Malin provided commentary, with Jim Gray serving as the sideline reporter.

References

External links

CBS Sports
CBS Sports Spectacular
CBS original programming
CBS Sports Network original programming
CBS Sports
American live television series
CBS
CBS Sports